The Melody 34 is a French sailboat that was designed by Andre Mauric and Gilles Vaton of the design firm Bureau Mauric, as a cruiser and first built in 1974.

Production
The design was built by Jeanneau in France, from 1974 until 1982, with 607 boats built.

Design
The Melody 34 is a recreational keelboat, built predominantly of fiberglass, with wood trim. It has a masthead sloop rig, with a deck-stepped mast, one set of straight spreaders and aluminum spars with stainless steel wire rigging. The hull has a raked stem, a reverse transom a skeg-mounted rudder controlled by a tiller and a fixed swept fin keel. It displaces  and carries  of cast iron ballast.

The design has sleeping accommodation for eight people, with a double "V"-berth in the bow cabin, an "L"-shaped settee and a straight settee in the main cabin and an aft cabin with a double berth on the starboard side. The galley is located on the port side at the companionway ladder. The galley is "U"-shaped and is equipped with a three-burner stove, ice box and a double sink. A navigation station is opposite the galley, on the starboard side. The head is located just aft of the bow cabin on the starboard side.

Operational history
Melody 34s have been sailed on extensive cruising voyages, including in the Caribbean.

See also
List of sailing boat types

References

External links

Keelboats
1970s sailboat type designs
Sailing yachts
Sailboat type designs by Andre Mauric
Sailboat type designs by Gilles Vaton
Sailboat types built by Jeanneau